Farma 4 - Pôjde o všetko! (English: The Farm 4 - This will be an all!) is the Slovak version of The Farm reality television show based on the Swedish television series of the same name. The show filmed in July–October 2013 and premiered on August 25, 2013 on Markíza.

Format
Seventeen contestants are cut out from outside world. Each week one contestant is selected the Farmer of the Week. In the first week, the contestants choose the Farmer. Since week 2, the Farmer is chosen by the contestant evicted in the previous week.

Nomination Process
The Farmer of the Week nominates two people (a man and a woman) as the Butlers. The others must decide, which Butler is the first to go to the Battle. That person than choose the second person (from the same sex) for the Battle and also the type of battle (a quiz, extrusion, endurance, sleight). The Battle winner must win two duels. The Battle loser is evicted from the game. In the live final 15 December 2013 Pavol Styk won 50 000 € . Božena Candráková finish on the second place. Pavol Styk won title Favorit Farmer.

Contestants 
Aages stated are at time of contest.

Future appearances
Jana Hrmová, Šárka Rácová and Ján Juhaščík returned to Farma for Farma: All-Stars. Hrmová was evacuated after 37 days and placing 9th, Juhaščík and Rácová respectively placing 8th and 5th.

Nominations

The game

External links
http://farma.markiza.sk
 Farma Markíza 

The Farm (franchise)
2013 Slovak television seasons